Shooting Stars Soccer Academy are the top academy team of the Italia Shooters. 

Association football clubs established in 2006
York Region Shooters
Canadian reserve soccer teams